Ramayampet is a Municipality and a  mandal in Medak District of Telangana State. Ramayampet was an Assembly Constituency in the former Andhra Pradesh State from 1952 to 2009 in Medak district in Indian state of Telangana.
Located on National Highway NH 44, The longest National Highway in India NH 44 in Ramayampet. 

Tanguturi Anjaiah who was the 7th Chief Minister of United Andhra Pradesh from 11-October-1980 to 24- February-1982, for a period of 1 year 136 days , was elected as an MLA from Ramayampet Assembly Constituency in the  6th general Elections which were held in the year 1978.

Notable political personalities of this mandal from 1990's are,

 Vittal Reddy
 Vasudeva Rao
 Devender Reddy

are a few of the many. 

.

Geography
Ramayampet is centrally located between Hyderabad and Nizamabad also between Siddipet and Sangareddy. It has got both National highway, state highway and rail transport system is just 4 km away from the town.

Demographics
 India census, Ramayampet had a population of 16899. Males constitute 49.16% of the population and females 50.84%. Ramayampet has an average literacy rate of 70.93%, lower than the national average of 74.04%: male literacy is 81.79% and female literacy is 60.45%. Ramayampet became municipality in 2018 with 12 wards.

References

The D. Dharmaram village Website

Mandals in Medak district

bpy:সিদ্দিপেত